Jerzy Tyszer from the Poznan University of Technology, Poznan, Poland was named Fellow of the Institute of Electrical and Electronics Engineers (IEEE) in 2013 for contributions to digital VLSI circuit testing and test compression.

References

Fellow Members of the IEEE
Living people
Year of birth missing (living people)
Place of birth missing (living people)
Academic staff of the Poznań University of Technology